The Loita Plains are a savanna and pastoral grazing ground in the southern Great Rift Valley in Kenya, just north of the Maasai Mara.

The plains and nearby Loita Hills have been the territory of the Maasai peoples since the 19th century and now include ranches and fences. Extensive surveys of the Loita Plains ecosystem were carried out by Vershuren and Misonne, the later an experienced taxonomist, in 1962-3. Focusing on small rodents, they found that most specimens were African grass rats or Natal multimammate mice, but that overall species diversity was very high.

In the northern Loita Plains, a substantial amount of land was converted to wheat field in the 1980s. This practice declined later on, but not before reducing the Loita wildebeest migration from 130,000 to only 30,000 individuals within the space of 15 years, mostly through blocking migration routes with fences. The Loita Plains were especially important to wildebeest during wet seasons; during dry seasons they would move south to the Maasai Mara and meet up with Tanzanian wildebeest from the Serengeti.

See also
East Africa
Serengeti

References

Temperate grasslands, savannas, and shrublands
Landforms of Kenya
Great Rift Valley
Plains of Africa